Ed Stewart (born March 2, 1972) is a former American football linebacker who played college football at the University of Nebraska–Lincoln and attended Mount Carmel High School in Chicago, Illinois. He was a consensus All-American in 1994. Stewart was named first-team All-Big Eight and Big Eight Defensive Player of the Year in 1994. He was also a member of the Amsterdam Admirals of the World League of American Football.

References

External links
Just Sports Stats

Living people
1972 births
Place of birth missing (living people)
Players of American football from Chicago
American football linebackers
African-American players of American football
Nebraska Cornhuskers football players
Amsterdam Admirals players
All-American college football players
American expatriate sportspeople in the Netherlands
21st-century African-American sportspeople
20th-century African-American sportspeople